Several Canadian naval units have been named HMCS Annapolis.

  (I) (ex-USS MacKenzie) was a Town-class destroyer that served in the Second World War and was scrapped in 1945.
  (II) was the lead ship of the Cold War-era Annapolis-class destroyer escorts. She was scuttled to make an artificial reef in 2015.

Battle honours
Atlantic 1941–43

Royal Canadian Navy ship names